Hirabad (sometimes spelt Heerabad; ; ; “Diamond Town”) is one of the oldest parts of the city of Hyderabad in Sindh, Pakistan. Before partition in 1947, Hirabad was a thriving township of wealthy Hindu Sindwork merchants and traders who generally belonged to the Amil and Bhaiband castes of Hindu Lohanas.

When the town was settled in the 1920s and 1930s, these Hindu merchants build extravagant palatial houses for themselves. Following Partition,  Hindu elites left their homeland leaving behind their properties to be taken over by Muslim refugees who had fled from India.

History 

Before its development and eventual occupation, the geography of Hirabad mainly consisted dry field plains with a sparse distribution of hillocks. The Talpur dynasty of Sindh saw it as a favourable place to erect magnificent mausoleums for their family, not much farther from the Sindh’s capital Hyderabad. For some time, these were the only structures in the area until the land was used to develop a new residential locality.

Late 19th and early 20th century 
The Hyderabad taluka was a mofussil (small town) and had a large population of Sindhi Hindu Lohanas, an Indian caste of merchants and traders. Chiefly amongst these were the Amils and Bhaibands. The Amils were a well-educated and travelled people who occupied the uppermost rung of the social ladder, whilst the Bhaibands were considered slightly less polished. There was a lesser population of Muslims who had been converted, after Muhammad bin Qasim's conquest of Sindh, principally from Bhaibands and had adopted Memon or Khatri (derived from Kshatriya) as their defining identity; these were mostly landowning zamindars.

The Amils and Bhaibands lived in the oldest part of the city, occupying whole streets in the bazaar area (now Shahi Bazaar) of Hyderabad, and were mostly Sindwork merchants and traders who spent much of their time abroad. In the mid-1930s, growing tensions following the Spanish Civil War adversely affected the operations of these merchants and they started returning to Hyderabad.  This contributed to a sudden growth in the population of the town which resulted in “a considerable physical expansion”.

Development of Hirabad 
The Hyderabad Municipality, having already drafted plans for town expansion since its constitution in 1853, started developing a new residential neighbourhood, north of the old city bazaar, in order to accommodate the growing numbers of people. Finally settled in the 1920s and 1930s, this new residential area started being called Hirabad (lit. "town of diamonds"), known so for its inhabitants who were mainly bankers, clerks and jewellers.

Seeing this as an opportunity to set themselves apart, the Amils relocated to this newly developed neighbourhood. Some Bhaibands and wealthier merchant firms followed, but still considered the older town a more favourable location even when Hirabad boasted better drainage facilities and electricity. As these rich merchants moved into the locality, they had “palatial mansions” built for themselves. It was because of this extravagance that the Hyderabadis were considered “‘townies’ with ‘refined taste’”.

Post-partition migration 
Following the Partition of British India, Sindhi Hindus migrated from their homeland to the Hindu majority areas of India, barely escaping the violent attacks of the Muslim refugees who fled anti-Muslim violence India and settled in Hyderabad. In doing so, the Hindus evicted and abandoned their palatial houses which were then immediately occupied by the Muslim migrants. The new impoverished refugee occupants who had themselves been forced to abandon their property in India had little to no regard for the architectural values of these buildings and, soon after, these buildings fell into disrepair.

The Hindu Sindworkis of Hyderabad liquidated whatever assets they had and left their homeland with all the belongings, losing all their immovable properties in Hyderabad. It was easier for these families to move from one place to another as their livelihood remained intact and “[Sindh] was not at all an essential part of their business operations”. A large number of Hyderabadi Amils and other Sindhi Hindu elites moved to Bombay and settled there as professionals or civil servants, however it was significantly harder for the Bhaibands and other lesser castes to weather the consequences of the partition.

Citations

References

See also
St Philip's Church (Hyderabad), a Protestant church

Hyderabad District, Pakistan